Elmer Joseph Cox (September 30, 1897 in Pasadena, California – June 1, 1966 in Morro Bay, California) was a professional baseball player who played outfield for the Brooklyn Robins in 1925 & 1926.  

He had a steady bat over his two seasons in the big leagues, batting .314 in 832 at bats, including eight home runs.  Cox spent most of his time in right field defensively. 

Prior to his playing days, Cox served in World War I.

He managed in the Arizona–Texas League in 1931 and 1932.

References

External links

1897 births
1966 deaths
Major League Baseball outfielders
Brooklyn Robins players
Baseball players from California
Portland Buckaroos (baseball) players
Salt Lake City Bees players
Portland Beavers players
Los Angeles Angels (minor league) players
Shreveport Sports players
Portland Buckaroos players
Minor league baseball managers
People from Pasadena, California